Sy Ari Brockington (born January 8, 1986), known professionally as Sy Ari da Kid, is an American singer, songwriter and rapper.

Early life 
Brockington was born in The Bronx, New York but moved to Atlanta, Georgia at the age of nine. As a child he dreamed of being a professional basketball player, but soon turned to rapping after influence from his brother and cousin. He attended Robert L. Osborne High School, alongside rapper K Camp. After graduation, Brockington would appear in battle raps on Atlanta's HOT 107.9 FM, where he was noted for 11 consecutive victories.

Career 
Brockington taught himself to produce and record with Pro Tools, which soon caught the attention of Grammy Award winning songwriter and producer Brian Michael Cox. Signed to December First Publishing Group, Brockington later launched his own independent label. Arrogant Music was launched in 2006, for which he serves as the CEO and main recording artist.

He released a number of mixtapes in 2011, including The Ultrasound, his first formal solo project. A further three mixtapes came in January 2012, including The Best of Da Kid Part One and Part Two. The collective mixtapes featured 106 tracks, used by Brockington to showcase his lyrical ability and versatility.

Over the following years, he continued to release multiple mixtapes while working with artists including Waka Flocka Flame, Future, Travis Porter and Roscoe Dash. On February 4, 2016, Brockington released B4 the Heartbreak, which featured Bryson Tiller on "Priorities". The mixtape also included features from Chasity, Lewis Sky and Tink.

He later confirmed a follow up album was in the making, titled 2Soon.

Artistry 
Talking about his musical process, Brockington said, "I don't write. I like to freestyle until I come off with a good hook or a good start to a verse. I don't like creating from scratch with other artists and producers as much as I should." He also felt he was not narrowed down by a single genre. He said, "I'm not an Atlanta or New York rapper, I feel I'm beyond a rapper. I like all genres of music and can create them as well".

In late 2015, rumours circulated that Brockington was ghost writing for Canadian rapper Drake. After releasing a song with Quentin Miller, who Meek Mill exposed as a co-writer for Drake, Brockington was forced to distance himself from the suggestions.

Personal life 
Brockington is a single father, something he regularly discusses in interviews. He describes how he wants to be a voice for single fathers, of which there are few in his industry who openly speak about the topic.

Discography

References 

1986 births
Living people
American rappers
Rappers from the Bronx
Singer-songwriters from New York (state)
21st-century American rappers